John P. Stevens High School (abbr. JP or JPS) is a four-year comprehensive public high school that serves students in ninth through twelfth grades from the northern end of Edison, in Middlesex County, New Jersey, United States. It is one of two high schools in the Edison Township Public Schools District, the other being Edison High School. The school has been accredited by the Middle States Association of Colleges and Schools Commission on Elementary and Secondary Schools since 1969 and is accredited through July 2029.

As of the 2021–22 school year, the school had an enrollment of 2,643 students and 162.3 classroom teachers (on an FTE basis), for a student–teacher ratio of 16.3:1. There were 169 students (6.4% of enrollment) eligible for free lunch and 42 (1.6% of students) eligible for reduced-cost lunch.

For the 2018 school year, the school offered 22 AP courses, with 50% of students participating, and 90% of participants receiving a passing AP score. The school also offers 54 student clubs, 25 varsity sports, a choir, band, and orchestra. The school has a 97% graduation rate with 95% of students enrolling in college (80% in 4-year programs and 15% in 2-year programs).

History
John P. Stevens High School was named after New Jersey textile giant John Peters Stevens Jr., who had served nearly two decades on the district's board of education, from 1940 to 1959, and was involved in an extensive range of civic, educational and philanthropic activities. Stevens served as President of J.P. Stevens & Co., a textile firm founded in 1813 that was one of the nation's largest and is now part of WestPoint Home. To avoid being confused with a junior high school, the postnominal "Jr." was omitted from the school's name. Constructed at a cost of $2.7 million (equivalent to $ million in ), the new high school opened in September 1964 with 33 classrooms designed for an enrollment of 1,000, though delays in construction meant that the auditorium and other special classrooms weren't complete.

Located in the Oak Tree neighborhood of the township, it rapidly expanded as the northern part of Edison grew, including residents from the Stephenville and New Dover communities. Originally, JPS was a senior high school, serving grades 10 through 12. In 1984, the Edison School District changed the junior high schools into middle schools, adding 9th grade into JPS.

Students
The population of J.P. Stevens High School enters primarily from  Woodrow Wilson Middle School and John Adams Middle School.

From the time it opened through the 1980s, the school's students were mostly Caucasian, with an African American minority coming from the Potters neighborhood. Beginning in the 1980s, J. P. Stevens saw increasing numbers of Indian-Americans. The largest group of students at J.P. Stevens is Asian American.
The average class size of the school is about 37 students. The school's ratio of students to computers is 1 to 1 while the state average is 4 to 1.

In the 2009–10 school year, on the Language Arts section of the High School Proficiency Assessment (HSPA), 53.1% of students scored proficient and 39.8% scored advanced. On the Math section of the test, 34.5% scored proficient and 54.1% scored advanced. The average SAT score was 1741 out of 2400. The Advanced Placement (AP) participation rate is 37.3%. The average attendance rate is 96.8%. The school had a suspension rate of 10%. 98.9% of JPS seniors graduated. 80% of the graduating seniors planned to go on to four-year colleges and another 16.9% of the graduating seniors expected to go on to two-year colleges.

Faculty
The faculty population of J.P. Stevens High School in 2022 is around 185 teachers, 5 administrators, 10 counselors, 2 college counselors, PATH Counselors, and a special services team.  The student to faculty ratio is 13 to 1. The average faculty member gets paid $55,035 a year while the state average was $52,563.

Curriculum
J.P. Stevens students are required to take four years of English, four years of math, three years of science, three years of history (two of U.S. and one of world) and at least two years of a foreign language (including Latin, French, Spanish, and starting the 2008–09 school year, Hindi). In 2012, Mandarin and Italian were also added. In addition, health and physical education classes are required for every year in which a student attends J.P. Stevens. Starting with the Class of 2008, one year of "21st Century Life and Economics/ Financial Literacy" such as Foods or Technology Fundamentals is required as well as another year of the "Visual Performing Arts" such Chorus, Band or Visual Arts. J.P. Stevens has an Honors as well as a college preparatory track that features several Advanced Placement courses.

2008-09 curriculum reform
Responding to numerous voices within the community for community reform, the Edison Board of Education formed the High School Reform Committee. This committee recommended that for the 2009–10 school year, Foods I and Foods II be converted to Foundations of Food and Nutrition. International Foods will be converted to Culinary Arts. The committee also recommended the "addition" of two AP classes as well: The conversion of Visual Arts 3 in title to AP Studio Art and the addition of AP World History as a Junior year elective.

School funding
The school received 88% of the money from local taxes. The total cost per pupil in the school district was $11,964.

Awards, recognition and rankings
In Newsweeks listing of "America's Best High Schools 2016", the school was ranked 127th of the 500 best high schools in the country; it was ranked 23rd among all high schools in New Jersey and tenth among the state's non-magnet schools.

In its 2013 report on  "America's Best High Schools", The Daily Beast ranked the school 294th in the nation among participating public high schools and 23rd among schools in New Jersey. in fact, famous singer/songwriter Andrew Fromm graduated from this school in 1993.

In the 2011 "Ranking America's High Schools" issue by The Washington Post, the school was ranked 33rd in New Jersey and 1,151st nationwide.

According to U.S. News & World Report, J.P. Stevens High School was ranked 36 in New Jersey in 2012, and has a national rank of 781. In 2013, JP Steven's state ranking rose to 32 and its national ranking rose to 467.

The school was the 30th-ranked public high school in New Jersey out of 339 schools statewide in New Jersey Monthly magazine's September 2014 cover story on the state's "Top Public High Schools", using a new ranking methodology. The school had been ranked 80th in the state of 328 schools in 2012, after being ranked 65th in 2010 out of 322 schools listed. The magazine ranked the school 52nd in 2008 out of 316 schools. The school was ranked 82nd in the magazine's September 2006 issue, which included 316 schools across the state. Schooldigger.com ranked the school tied for 97th out of 381 public high schools statewide in its 2011 rankings (an increase of 7 positions from the 2010 ranking) which were based on the combined percentage of students classified as proficient or above proficient on the mathematics (88.3%) and language arts literacy (95.1%) components of the High School Proficiency Assessment (HSPA).

The graduating class of 2013 had 31 National Merit Scholarship Semi-Finalists and 62 Commended Students.

In 2014, the band director, Andrew DeNicola, was a top 10 finalist for the 2014 Grammy Music Educator Award.

In 2015, CNN featured J.P. Stevens as "The $2.5 billion high school", highlighting three e-commerce companies founded by recent graduates.

Extracurricular activities

Robotics
Team 2554, The Warhawks, is a FIRST Robotics Competition team that started in the 2007–2008 school year at John P. Stevens High School. The team consists of two major sub-teams: Marketing and Build; the marketing sub-team is responsible for bringing in the money to maintain tools and buy parts for the robot, which is done through sponsorships from other companies and local fundraising events. The build team is responsible for building the competition robot. As a part of FRC, the team competes in 2 district events in the First Mid-Atlantic Region, competing against other teams in the region. The team also participates in off-season competition events, such as Brunswick Eruption, after the official season is over.

In addition to robotics competitions, Team 2554 performs community outreach events that encourage young kids to pursue a career in STEM, by teaching the basics of robotics and performing live demonstrations. During the Summer of 2021, they had over 2,100+ signups from children from all across the globe.

During the FIRST Robotics Competition during 2020-2021, The Warhawks, had made it to Global Finalists, for the Global Innovation Challenge, sponsored by Star Wars: Force For Change. They placed within the top 20 teams out of 800+ teams internationally.

Athletics
The J.P. Stevens High School Hawks compete in the Red Division of the Greater Middlesex Conference, which operates under the supervision of the New Jersey State Interscholastic Athletic Association (NJSIAA). With 1,849 students in grades 10–12, the school was classified by the NJSIAA for the 2019–20 school year as Group IV for most athletic competition purposes, which included schools with an enrollment of 1,060 to 5,049 students in that grade range. The football team competes in Division 5D of the Big Central Football Conference, which includes 60 public and private high schools in Hunterdon, Middlesex, Somerset, Union and Warren counties, which are broken down into 10 divisions by size and location. The school was classified by the NJSIAA as Group V North for football for 2018–2020. The school competes against nearby rivals such as East Brunswick High School, Edison High School and Woodbridge High School.

The school participates together with Metuchen High School in a joint ice hockey team in which Edison High School is the host school / lead agency. The co-op program operates under agreements scheduled to expire at the end of the 2023–24 school year.

Interscholastic sports offered include:

The football team won the Central Jersey Group IV state sectional title in 1977, 1978, 1982, 1984, 1985 and 2001. The 1977 team finished the season with a 10-0-1 record and won its first playoff-era title with a 35–0 victory against Middletown High School North in the Central Jersey Group IV championship game. The 1978 team won the Central Jersey Group IV title with a 14–7 win against Watchung Hills Regional High School. In 2001, the team finished the season with a 12–0 record after winning the Central Jersey Group IV title with a 14–7 win against Old Bridge High School in the championship game on a touchdown scored with just over a minute left in the game; the 2001 team earned consideration from the Courier News as one of "the best in GMC history".

Janet Smith won the girls' 5,000 meter race at the 1983 Kinney National High School Cross-Country Championships held in Balboa Park, San Diego, California, with a time of 16 minutes 43.7 seconds. With victories as Group IV individual cross country champion from 1980 to 1983, Smith became the first girl to win an individual state championship in four consecutive years.

The softball team finished the 2000 season with a 24–6 record after winning the Group IV state championship, defeating runner-up Clifton High School by a score of 4–0 in the tournament finals.

The wrestling team won the North II Group IV state sectional championship in 2004

Model United Nations
The Model United Nations club, JPSMUN, has performed well for years, and has consistently ranked among the top 10 high schools in America. It has earned the special distinction as being the only public high school on the list. The team has received Outstanding Large Delegation and Best Small Delegation awards, as well as a few prestigious Best Large Delegation awards. These include that of HMUN 2012 and RUMUN 2016. Recently, the team has also won Outstanding Large Delegations awards at WAMUNC & VAMUN 2017, and also ILMUNC 2018. In January 2022, the team won the Best Large Delegation award at ILMUNC for the first time in its history. In February 2022, the team won the Outstanding Large Delegation award at NAIMUN. The team hosts three in-house conferences for the purposes of competition and training each year. The team is well recognized and decorated across the circuit. Several members of the team earned national records for consecutive Best Delegate awards.

Quiz Bowl

The Quiz Bowl team, STARS (now JPS Quiz Bowl) has been successful. The team has made Top 16 of 68 in the Bridgewater-Raritan Invitational Tournament of Excellence (BRITE) three times in a row and once was a quarter-finalist. In 2009, for the first time, the STARS were named Champions in BRITE and placed 30th out of 119 at Questions Unlimited's National Academic Championship. It has qualified for nationals thrice. It competes in Tri-State area events and has branched out to other competitions, namely History Bowl, in which it placed 51st in 2018, and 24th in 2019. In 2021, JPS Quiz Bowl tied for 31st place at HSNCT nationals, with the B team having tied for 49th place and the History Bowl team having placed 21st. The Quizbowl team has additionally placed highly at regional tournaments, including first place at Princeton University's PHSAT XXVIII. In the 2022-23 season, the JP Stevens Quiz Bowl team was ranked 8th in the country.

Music

Chorus

The J.P. Stevens Choir has won numerous awards, including Best Overall Choir at National and State competitions.

In 2017, JPS Chamber Choir and A cappella Ensemble both participated in the Interkultur Sing 'N'Joy Princeton International Choir Competition. A cappella Ensemble was named Category Winner for the Sacred Music Category and Chamber Choir was named Category Winner in the Mixed Choir level 1 Category. Chamber Choir was also the Grand Prize Winner, with an endowed prize of US$2000. Moreover, the Chamber Choir received the Special Prize of an autographed copy of the first four measures of Morten Lauridsen's "O Magnum Mysterium," presented by the composer.

Many students from the choir are accepted into the Regions II Choir, the NJ All-State Choir, All-Eastern High School Honor Choir, and Governor's School of the Arts.

 Concert Choir
 A Cappella Ensemble
 Men's Ensemble
 Treble choir
 Chamber Ensemble

Band

The J.P. Stevens High School band program has approximately 200 students participating in several ensembles, including a marching band, jazz ensemble, and wind ensemble. The program enjoys the majority of its success with its wind bands and jazz ensembles. Its wind ensemble is a perennial participant at the New Jersey Concert Band Gala and Mid-Atlantic Honors Wind Band Festival. In addition, its jazz ensemble has won eleven state championships, including a three-peat from 2009 to 2011 and a four-peat from 2016 to 2019.

The program consistently places a good proportion of its students in regional and statewide honor bands. In addition, its alumni have been educated at top tier music schools and conservatories around the country, notably at the Juilliard School, the Manhattan School of Music, the Berklee College of Music, and the University of North Texas, among others.  Its alumni, most notably David Bryan, have also performed with the CBS Orchestra, Gordon Goodwin's Big Phat Band, the Maynard Ferguson Orchestra, the Mel Lewis/Thad Jones Orchestra, and Bon Jovi, among others.

The program annually hosts Bandboozle, a benefit dance that helps VH1's Save the Music, and had hosted a Comedy Night in honor of a late student in order to give out the Adonis Smith Memorial Scholarship. The Comedy Night had been hosted on numerous occasions by Kel Mitchell.

Orchestra
The John P. Stevens orchestra program has over one hundred members  Each year a number of students audition and are selected to participate in both CJMEA Regions II and All-State Orchestra. The orchestras compete each year in various orchestra festivals.

The J.P. Stevens High School Orchestra Program consists of three orchestras, including a number of string quartets.  Chamber Orchestra includes up to 35 students who are selected by audition and perform standard orchestral literature.  Concert Orchestra has more than 60 students and Symphonic Orchestra over 80 students. Students who play in the string quartet are selected by audition and perform for weddings and other fundraisers around the community.

Theatre company
The John P. Stevens award-winning theatre company has been an ongoing program in the school for many years now. Since the foundation of the company, several Broadway and off-Broadway shows have been performed; some notable include: Grease, Into the Woods, Pippin, The Wiz, Leader of the Pack and Urinetown: The Musical. The theatre company's production of Urinetown garnered several honorable mentions and nominations by the NJ Paper Mill Playhouse Rising Star Awards. Other productions by the company from the past include Macbeth, The Musical Comedy Murders of 1940, A Funny Thing Happened on the Way to the Forum, You're A Good Man, Charlie Brown and Working among others. The theatre company put on a production of Jerome Lawrence and Robert E. Lee's Inherit the Wind in November 2007. The company put on perhaps their most successful and lauded show ever: the Stephen Sondheim musical Sweeney Todd: The Demon Barber of Fleet Street in April 2008.  Since then, they have put on The Odyssey, Tommy, The Crucible, and Jekyll & Hyde. In the fall of 2010, the company performed the play, Metamorphoses. In 2011, the company performed the rock opera hit Rent and Our Town. In 2019, their musical was Chicago: The Musical and their Fall Play was A Midsummer Night's Dream. In the fall of 2019, their fall play was Vintage Hitchcock: A Live Radio Play. Their musical for the 2020 school year was The Addams Family, but the production was cut to two show nights due to the COVID-19 pandemic. Likewise, due to the pandemic, the company did not have a formal fall show, but opted to present a series of online one-acts under the title of "Virtuality." In spring 2021, the company's spring musical was The Theory of Relativity, a musical about the importance of relationships and connectivity, teaching lessons that everyone needed to hear amidst a global pandemic. The fall play for the 2021-22 school year was Almost, Maine by John Cariani, and the musical was Mamma Mia!.

"More Ways Out" improv troupe

The "More Ways Out" improv troupe meets every Thursday after school, to practice along with other students the art of "staying on ones toes". In the past years the "More Ways Out" improv troupe has won best in state numerous times. Most recently, the troupe went to New York City for an improv workshop encountering many professionals, as well as attending the NYC comedy festival.

Other

SerenAIDe is an annual, entirely student-run, benefit concert organized to raise money and awareness for victims of Amyotrophic lateral sclerosis (Lou Gehrig's Disease). This event takes place in the first week of May. The concert was inspired by the choral director's husband's struggle against this disease. Over the last three years the students have successfully raised over $24,000 towards the ALS foundation and the Jewish Community Center of Belle Mead, New Jersey.

Administration
The school's interim principal is Doug Covert. His core administration team includes four assistant principals.

Notable alumni

Notable alumni include those who have been inducted into the school's Hall of Honor:
 Peter J. Barnes III (born 1956, class of 1974), New Jersey Superior Court judge who served in the New Jersey General Assembly and New Jersey Senate, where he represented the 18th Legislative District.
 David Bryan (born 1962), who plays the keyboards in the hard rock band Bon Jovi.
 Alan Chez (born 1961, class of 1979), trumpet player vocalist for the CBS orchestra on the Late Show with David Letterman.
 Jun Choi (born 1971), former Mayor of Edison.
 Steven Fulop (born 1977, class of 1995), Mayor of Jersey City.
 Chris Petrucelli (born 1962, class of 1980), soccer manager who is currently the head coach of the Chicago Red Stars in the National Women's Soccer League.
 Mark L. Polansky (born 1956, class of 1974), NASA astronaut.
 David Rosenthal (born 1961) keyboardist, music producer and songwriter.
 Matt Salzberg, businessperson and entrepreneur who co-founded Blue Apron (where he was CEO), Embark Veterinary and Suma Brands.
 Akhil Sharma (born 1971), author and professor of creative writing who wrote the novels An Obedient Father and Family Life.
 George A. Spadoro (class of 1966), politician who served three terms as Mayor of Edison, and two terms in the New Jersey General Assembly, where he represented the 18th Legislative District.
 Joel Stein (born 1971, class of 1989), journalist, media personality and columnist for the Los Angeles Times.
 Jeremy Zuttah (born 1986, class of 2004), Baltimore Ravens football player.

References

External links
School webpage
J.P. Stevens High School Band
JPS Warhawks - FIRST Robotics Team
J.P. Stevens High School page from Edison Township Public Schools

Data for J.P. Stevens High School, National Center for Education Statistics
J.P. Stevens Hawks Athletics
J.P. Stevens Choir

Edison, New Jersey
1964 establishments in New Jersey
Educational institutions established in 1964
Middle States Commission on Secondary Schools
Public high schools in Middlesex County, New Jersey
Schools in Middlesex County, New Jersey